This is a list of stations that were affiliated with Air America Radio at the time of its shutdown in January 2010.

Affiliate list

Conventional radio

Former affiliates

References

External links
 AAR station list

Air America (radio network)